The national flag of Qatar is in the ratio of 11:28. It is maroon with a broad white serrated band (nine white points) on the hoist side. It was adopted shortly before the country declared independence from Britain on 3 September 1971.

The flag is very similar to the flag of the neighbouring country Bahrain, which has fewer points, a 3:5 proportion, and a red colour instead of maroon. Qatar's flag is the only national flag having a width more than twice its height.

History
Qatar's historic flag was plain red, in correspondence with the red banner traditionally used by the Kharjite leader Qatari ibn al-Fuja'a. In the 19th century, the country modified its entirely red flag with the addition of a white vertical stripe at the hoist to suit the British directive. After this addition, Sheikh Mohammed bin Thani officially adopted a patterned purple-red and white flag which bore a strong resemblance to its modern derivative. Several additions were made to the Qatari flag in 1932, with the nine-pointed serrated edge, diamonds, and the word "Qatar" being integrated into its design. The maroon colour was standardised in 1936. In the 1960s, Sheikh Ali Al Thani removed the wording and diamonds from the flag. The flag was officially adopted on 9 July 1971 and was virtually identical to the 1960s flag, except the height-to-width proportion.

Characteristics

Pattern
Nine serrated edges separate the coloured and white portions. They signify Qatar's inclusion as the 9th member of the Emirates of Trucial Oman after Bahrain, Dubai, Abu Dhabi, Ajman, Fujairah, Sharjah, Ras Al Khaimah and Umm Al Quwain at the conclusion of the Qatari-British treaty in 1916.

Colour
In 2012, the Qatari government defined the exact shade of the Qatari flag as Pantone 1955 C, or 'Qatar maroon'. The history of purple dye in the country dates back several centuries. It has been asserted that Qatar was the site of the earliest known production of shellfish dye during the rule of the Kassites due to the presence of a purple dye industry on Al Khor Islands. Qatar was also known for its production of purple dye during the rule of the Sasanian Empire. Mohammed bin Thani, who ruled from 1847 to 1876, proposed the creation a flag with a purple-red colour in order to unify the state, and to highlight its historic role in the production of dye. In 1932, the British Navy suggested an official flag should be designed. According to the Qatari government, the British proposed that the flag be white and red, but Qatar rejected the red colouring and continued using a mixture of purple and red instead. According to letters from the British political agent in the Persian gulf to British India, the white cloth was purchased in Bahrain and was originally dyed red locally. The locally purchased dye was of poor quality that faded rapidly, causing the flag to take a chocolate colour.  Due to the country's subtropical desert climate, the flag's colours were prone to be tinted darker by the sun, which resulted in the eventual adoption of a maroon colouring in 1936. The white portion of the flag symbolises the peace procured from signing anti-piracy treaties with the British.

Historical flags

See also
Qatar National Day
Emblem of Qatar

References

External links
Flag of Qatar
al-adaam (qatar flag) 

Flags introduced in 1971
Flags of Asia
Flag
Qatar